Kleanthis Bargkas (born 24 July 1978) is a Greek cyclist. He competed in the men's team sprint at the 2000 Summer Olympics.

References

External links
 

1978 births
Living people
Greek male cyclists
Olympic cyclists of Greece
Cyclists at the 2000 Summer Olympics
Sportspeople from Thessaloniki
21st-century Greek people